Perdiendo el juicio is a Mexican comedy series produced by Guillermo del Bosque for TelevisaUnivision. It premiered on Las Estrellas on 27 September 2021. The series stars Roberto Palazuelos, Lola Cortés, Alejandro Tomassi, Jorge van Rankin, Paul Stanley, Juan Carlos Nava, and Hugo Alcántar.

The series has been renewed for a second season, that premiered on 25 April 2022.

Premise 
Each episode of the series features a celebrity being put on trial for an offense they have committed or for something they are accused of in the artistic world.

Cast 
 Roberto Palazuelos (season 1)
 Lola Cortés 
 Alejandro Tomassi (season 1)
 Jorge van Rankin
 Paul Stanley
 Juan Carlos Nava
 Hugo Alcántara
 Jesús Ochoa (season 2)
 Alexis Ayala (season 2)
 Luis Felipe Tovar (season 2)

Production 
Filming of the series began on 2 September 2021. Filming of the second season began on 2 March 2022.

Episodes

Series overview

Season 1 (2021)

Season 2  (2022)

Ratings 
 

| link2             = #Season 2 (2022)
| episodes2         = 12
| start2            = 
| end2              = 
| startrating2      = 1.6
| endrating2        = 1.5
| viewers2          = |2}} 
}}

References

External links 
 

2021 Mexican television series debuts
Las Estrellas original programming
Mexican television sitcoms
Television series by Televisa
Spanish-language television shows